These are the singles that reached number one on the Top 100 Singles chart in 1988 as published by Cash Box magazine.

See also
1988 in music
List of Hot 100 number-one singles of 1988 (U.S.)

References
https://web.archive.org/web/20110818051641/http://cashboxmagazine.com/archives/80s_files/1988.html

1988
1988 record charts
1988 in American music